Lady Dongsanwon of the Suncheon Bak clan was the eldest maternal granddaughter of Gyeon Hwon and daughter of Bak Yeong-gyu. She became the 18th wife of King Taejo of Goryeo and was the oldest, among Queen Mungong and Queen Munseong who both became Jeongjong's wives.

References

External links
동산원부인 on Encykorea .

Consorts of Taejo of Goryeo
Year of birth unknown
Year of death unknown
People from Suncheon